MGS-0039 is a drug that is used in neuroscientific research, which acts as a potent and selective antagonist for group II of the metabotropic glutamate receptors (mGluR2/3). It produces antidepressant and anxiolytic effects in animal studies, and has been shown to boost release of dopamine and serotonin in specific brain areas. Research has suggested this may occur through a similar mechanism as that suggested for the similarly glutamatergic drug ketamine.

References 

MGlu2 receptor antagonists
MGlu3 receptor antagonists